Isaac Mao is a Chinese software architect, and social media researcher. He is doing research in social learning and for developing the philosophy of Sharism.

Life and work 
Mao is a blogger, software architect, researcher in learning and social technology. Mao has written about on-line journalism. Mao's essay "Sharism: A Mind Revolution" appeared in the Freesouls book project.

Blogging and blog advocacy 

Mao has visited some conferences (such as Wikimania about Internet culture, in China and more broadly and other global events on Internet culture. In 2009, he was a speaker at the 40th anniversary of The Internet Conference held at UCLA As a trained software engineer, he has a long history of developing both business and consumer software. He worked as a Chief Architect in the Intel HomeCD project and Tangram BackSchool suite.

As of 2008, Mao published an open letter to Google, challenging the search engine giant to support anti-censorship efforts and change its strategy on China.

References

External links

 The 'blog' revolution sweeps across China, an article on New Scientists, November, 2004.
 Isaac Mao's blog
 English entries in Isaac Mao's blog
 Not Losing Facebook in China - The Economist, on Internet in China and Isaac Mao views.

Chinese bloggers
Living people
Year of birth missing (living people)
Shanghai Jiao Tong University alumni